Ministry of Environmental Protection may refer to:

Ministry of Environmental Protection (Israel)
Ministry of Environmental Protection (Serbia)
Ministry of Environmental Protection of the People's Republic of China

See also
Ministry of Environmental Protection and Agriculture of Georgia
Ministry of Environmental Protection and Energy (Croatia)
List of environmental ministries